Nishesh Basavareddy (born May 2, 2005) is an American tennis player.

Basavareddy has a career high ATP singles ranking of 1732 achieved on August 15, 2022. He also has a career high ATP doubles ranking of 1191 achieved on August 8, 2022.

Basavareddy won the 2022 US Open – Boys' doubles title with Ozan Baris. He plays college tennis at Stanford University.

Junior Grand Slam titles

Doubles: 1 (1 title)

References

External links

2005 births
Living people
American male tennis players
Sportspeople from Newport Beach, California
US Open (tennis) junior champions
Stanford Cardinal men's tennis players
Grand Slam (tennis) champions in boys' doubles
21st-century American people
Tennis people from California